Shahrdari Mahshahr Football Club is an Iranian football club based in Mahshahr, Iran. They currently compete in the Azadegan League.

History
Shahrdari Mahshahr earned promotion to League 2 after finishing in first place of Group B in the 2014–15 edition of League 3. In 2017 for the first time in their history, the club was promoted to the 2nd tiered Azadegan League after finishing in first place of Group B.

Season-by-Season

The table below shows the achievements of the club in various competitions.

See also
 31 different Provincial Leagues

References

Football clubs in Iran
Association football clubs established in 2004
2004 establishments in Iran